Vivian Robinson (16 May 1897 – 28 February 1979) was an English cricketer. He played for Gloucestershire in 1923.

References

1897 births
1979 deaths
English cricketers
Gloucestershire cricketers
Cricketers from Bristol